István Hamar (born 6 October 1970 in Budapest) is a Hungarian football player who currently plays for Vecsés FC in the Hungarian Second Division. In addition to playing for professional teams in Hungary, he played for the Hungarian national team.

References
HLSZ
UEFA
EUFO
wldcup.com

Hungarian footballers
Hungarian expatriate footballers
Budapest Honvéd FC players
Vecsés FC footballers
Vanspor footballers
1970 births
Living people
Beitar Jerusalem F.C. players
Maccabi Netanya F.C. players
Expatriate footballers in Israel
Expatriate footballers in Turkey
Hungarian expatriate sportspeople in Israel
Hungarian expatriate sportspeople in Turkey
Association football midfielders
Hungary international footballers
Footballers from Budapest